Katja Maria Elisabeth Nyberg (born 16 September 1971) is a Swedish police officer and politician for the Sweden Democrats. She was elected as a member of the Riksdag during the 2018 Swedish general election.

Nyberg worked as a police officer and for the Swedish Security Service before serving as an MP. In addition, she has also been a member of the party board for the Sweden Democrats in Stockholm and serves on the Justice Committee in the Riksdag. In this role, she focuses on tackling gang crime and honor violence. Nyberg has described herself as being on the more moderate wing of the SD and that she wouldn't have joined the earlier versions of the party.

References 

1971 births
Swedish police officers
Living people
Members of the Riksdag 2018–2022
Members of the Riksdag from the Sweden Democrats
Members of the Riksdag 2022–2026
Women members of the Riksdag
21st-century Swedish politicians
21st-century Swedish women politicians